Peter or Pete Allen may refer to:

Music
Peter Allen (musician) (1944–1992), Australian songwriter and singer
Peter Allen (composer) (born 1952), Canadian composer mainly known for his film scores
Pete Allen (musician) (born 1954), English dixieland jazz clarinettist

Politics
Peter Allen (Australian politician) (c. 1855–1925), Australian politician
Peter Allen (Alderney politician) (born 1965), member of the States of Alderney
Peter Buell Allen (1775–1833), politician and military commander in New York State

Sports
Peter Allen (footballer) (1946–2023), holder of appearance record at Leyton Orient
Peter Allen (ice hockey) (born 1970), Canadian former ice hockey defenceman
Pete Allen (baseball) (1868–1946), American Major League Baseball catcher

Broadcasting
Peter Allen (UK broadcaster) (born 1946), British broadcaster, a main presenter of BBC Radio Five Live and former ITN correspondent
Peter Allen (US broadcaster) (1920–2016), American broadcaster, host of the Metropolitan Opera radio broadcasts

Other
Sir Peter Allen (industrialist) (1905–1993), chairman of Imperial Chemical Industries
Peter Allen (physician) (1921–2014), Canadian surgeon
Peter Lewis Allen (born 1957), British author
Peter Allen (1943–1964), executed in England for the murder of John Alan West

See also
Peter Allan (disambiguation)
Allen (surname)